Mordecai Paldiel (born Markus Wajsfeld, March 10, 1937) is a lecturer at Stern College (Yeshiva University) and Queens College in New York.

He received a B.A. from Hebrew University and an M.A. and Ph.D. in Religion and Holocaust Studies from Temple University in Philadelphia. Paldiel is the former Director (1984-2007) of the Department of the Righteous Among the Nations at Yad Vashem in Jerusalem. He has written several books devoted to the subject including The Path of the Righteous: Gentile Rescuers of Jews During the Holocaust published in 1993 by the KTAV Publishing House.

Paldiel was born into a Hassidic family of Szlomo Wajsfeld, a diamond trader originally from Miechów near Kraków and Hinde née Labin from Uhnow (now Ukraine) as one of their five children before World War II. Thanks to a Catholic Priest who was able to smuggle them across the border, the family fled from Nazi occupied Belgium via France to Switzerland in 1940 when he was 3 years old. Later after the war the family emigrated to New York.

Publications 

 Mordecai Paldiel (1982), Secular Dualism: The 'religious' Nature of Hitler's Antisemitism, Temple University
 Mordecai Paldiel (1992), כל המקיים נפש אחת: חסידי אומות העולם וייחודם University of Michigan
 Mordecai Paldiel (1993), The Path of the Righteous: Gentile Rescuers of Jews .., 
 Mordecai Paldiel (1996), Sheltering the Jews: stories of Holocaust rescuers, 
 Mordecai Paldiel (2006), Churches and the Holocaust: Unholy Teaching .., 
 Mordecai Paldiel (2007), Diplomat Heroes of the Holocaust, 
 Mordecai Paldiel (2007), The righteous among the nations, 
 Mordecai Paldiel (2011), Saving the Jews: Men and Women who Defied the Final Solution,  
 Mordecai Paldiel (2017), Saving One's Own: Jewish Rescuers During the Holocaust, .

References

1937 births
Hebrew University of Jerusalem alumni
Living people
Jewish historians
Jewish writers
Jewish emigrants from Nazi Germany to the United States
Queens College, City University of New York faculty
Temple University alumni
Yad Vashem people
Yeshiva University faculty